Scott Goodyear (born December 20, 1959) is a Canadian former race car driver. He ran the Indy Racing League and Champ Car series during his career from 1987, winning the Michigan 500 in 1992 and 1994.

Goodyear qualified for eleven runnings of the Indy 500 races from 1990 to 2001, missing only the 1996 race which he did not enter. After starting last (33rd position) in the 1992 race, he finished second to Al Unser Jr. by 0.043 seconds. Goodyear could have won the 1995 race, driving with Tasman Motorsports. But after leading 42 laps, he mistakenly passed the pace car on a late, very slow restart. He was penalized to fourteenth place after ignoring the black flags. That race was given to Jacques Villaneuve.  Goodyear again finished second in the 1997 race after being passed by Arie Luyendyk on the backstraightaway at lap 194. He might have won if not for a controversial restart on the last lap, when the green and white flag waved despite the on-track lights still signaling yellow. Goodyear, who had expected the race to finish under caution, was weaving his car to keep his tires warm at the time of the restart. Meanwhile, eventual winner Luyendyk had already begun accelerating away from the field.

He drove in a couple of CART races for Walker Racing in 1996 before a practice accident at the Emerson Fittipaldi Speedway in Rio de Janeiro, Brazil sidelined him for most of the season. In 1997 he moved to the Indy Racing League with Treadway Racing and the next year, he moved to Panther Racing, where he stayed for three seasons just losing out for the series title in 2000 to Buddy Lazier. He retired from his racing career after a crash with Sarah Fisher in the 2001 Indianapolis 500 and then he became a color analyst for ABC and ESPN's coverage of the IndyCar Series, with Paul Page, Jack Arute, Rusty Wallace, Todd Harris, Marty Reid, Allen Bestwick and Eddie Cheever.

In 1988, he was crowned champion of the Rothmans Porsche Turbo Cup series driving the Pop 84 / Pfaff 944 Turbo race car, winning 3 out of the 8 races. He also co-drove the second of the factory entered Porsche GT1 machines in the 1996 24 Hours of Le Mans with Yannick Dalmas and Karl Wendlinger. They finished third behind the other GT1 and the winning #7 Porsche WSC-95 of Joest Racing.

Goodyear was inducted into the Canadian Motorsport Hall of Fame in 2002 and the Ontario Sports Hall of Fame in 2014.

Goodyear was announced as the Race Director for both the Formula 4 United States Championship and the F3 Americas Championship starting in the 2019 season.

Racing record

American open–wheel racing results
(key)

CART Indy Car World Series

Indy Racing League

 1 The 1999 VisionAire 500K at Charlotte was cancelled after 79 laps due to spectator fatalities. Goodyear qualified 3rd and was running 2nd when it was red-flagged.

Indy Racing League career summary

3 wins, 0 championships

Indianapolis 500

Complete 24 Hours of Le Mans results

International Race of Champions
(key) (Bold – Pole position. * – Most laps led.)

See also

 List of Canadians in Champ Car

References

External links
Scott Goodyear ESPN Bio
1992 video of Indy 500 finish

1959 births
Living people
Racing drivers from Ontario
Canadian sports announcers
Canadian people of English descent
Champ Car drivers
Indianapolis 500 drivers
IndyCar Series drivers
International Race of Champions drivers
Atlantic Championship drivers
Trans-Am Series drivers
Motorsport announcers
Sportspeople from Toronto
24 Hours of Le Mans drivers
World Sportscar Championship drivers
International Kart Federation drivers
Porsche Motorsports drivers
Walker Racing drivers
Tasman Motorsports drivers
Cheever Racing drivers
Panther Racing drivers
Jaguar Racing drivers